The Kovpakivskyi District is a district of the city of Sumy. The population of the district is about 140,000.

The district does not have its own self-governing body. Since the expiration of the powers of Zarichnyi District and Kovpakivskyi District councils of the XXIII convocation, in the city of Sumy it was decided not to form representative bodies on the territory of Kovpakivskyi and Zarichnyi Districts of the city by the decision of the Sumy city council of October 4, 2000.

Downtown Sumy and the city hall are located in Kovpakivskyi District.

References

Sumy